Swimming in Australia refers to the sport of Swimming played in Australia. The sport has a high level of participation in the country both recreational and professional.

History
Frederick Lane was the first Australian olympic swimmer.

Governing Body
Swimming Australia is the national sporting body.

Tournaments
Australian Swim Team known as The Dolphins participates in major competitions:
 Summer Olympic Games
 FINA Long Course World Championships
 FINA Short Course World Championships
 Commonwealth Games
 Pan Pacific Swimming Championships

References

 
Wikipedia articles in need of updating from March 2013